The Zobel Lady Junior Archers may refer to the women's football team of the De La Salle Santiago Zobel School which competed in the PFF Women's League, the top-flight women's football league in the Philippines. De La Salle Zobel, along with Tuloy F.C., debuted in the 2018 season of the league. Their first league match was on August 25, 2018 where they were routed by OutKast 2–10.

See also
 Zobel Junior Archers

References

University Athletic Association of the Philippines football teams
Women's football clubs in the Philippines
PFF Women's League clubs